Planet Eggz is the tenth studio album by King Creosote, released in 1999.

Track listing

References 

2000 albums
King Creosote albums